Harvest Moon: Frantic Farming is a farming puzzle video game developed by Platinum-Egg Inc. It was released for Nintendo DS and iOS on August 25, 2009. At E3 2011, Natsume announced the game would be ported to Android in Summer 2011. The game features twelve playable characters along with Download Play Multi-Player for the Nintendo DS version.

Plot
The players compete to gather vegetables to fix a mysterious glowing tower that is causing vegetables to sprout at random all over Sunny Island.

Reception

Harvest Moon: Frantic Farming received mainly positive critical reception upon release. Lauren Ronaghan of Nintendo World Report praised the game's puzzle elements, calling the game "immense fun", and while GamePro's Aaron Kohn agreed on the strong puzzle gameplay, he noted the game's unequal distribution in difficulty. Nintendo Power and Official Nintendo Magazine gave the game an 8 out of 10 and 75% respectively. GameZone Derek Buck concluded that although Harvest Moon: Frantic Farming does not offer much in innovation, the gameplay is where it excels.

References

External links
 Official website

2009 video games
Android (operating system) games
BlackBerry games
Nintendo DS games
IOS games
Puzzle video games
Video games developed in Japan
Frantic Farming
Rising Star Games games
Natsume (company) games